Charles R. Weatherhogg (1872 – October 15, 1937) was an American architect from Fort Wayne, Indiana. He was born in Donington, England and attended the Art Institute of Lincoln in Lincolnshire. He worked for an architect in Lincolnshire before coming to the United States to see the 1893 World's Fair, lived in Chicago for a year, and settled in Fort Wayne in 1892.

He settled in Fort Wayne, working briefly with the firm of Wing & Mahurin, before he opened an office with Alfred Grindle, himself a fellow Wing and Mahurin employee. Grindle and Weatherhogg maintained a partnership from about 1893-1897. They had a branch office in Muncie and designed a number of large homes in that city. Their most important project together was the Jasper County Courthouse, 1897, also in Rensselaer. Grindle first received the commission for the Jasper County Courthouse, then brought in Weatherhogg.  Grindle left the project entirely to Weatherhogg, who then completed most of the design work. The courthouse is an imposing three story limestone building with tower executed in the Chateauesque/Tudor Revival style. Weatherhogg went on to design a number of buildings in Fort Wayne, including several schools, the Masonic Temple, Blackstone Building, Fairfield Apartments, and the People's Trust and Savings Bank. Although adept at many styles, Weatherhogg often used a variant of classicism in his works

Weatherhogg had a brief partnership with Alfred Grindle until Grindle moved to Muncie.

Work
 Hoagland High School (Heritage Elementary). Set to be demolished in 2020
 Louis Curdes House 
 Neizer-McMillen House (McMillen Mansion) at 1345 Westover Road in Southwood Park, in Fort Wayne
 North Side High School 
 Journal-Gazette Building 
 Central High School (Fort Wayne, Indiana) 
 Fairfield Manor 
Estelle Peabody Memorial Home and later addition, as well as the Memorial Chapel, Memorial Tower, and the residence of Tom Peabody, Manchester
Central school building, his first work in North Manchester, Indiana 
John Snyder residence, Manchester
 Manchester College gymnasium, Manchester
Jasper County Courthouse, Rensselaer
Rensselaer Carnegie Library
Irene Byron Tuberculosis Sanatorium
J.C. Johnson House, Muncie, Indiana

See also
McColloch-Weatherhogg Double House

References

External links
 

1872 births
1937 deaths
Architects from Fort Wayne, Indiana
English emigrants to the United States
People from Donington, Lincolnshire